The Amundi German Masters is a golf tournament on the Ladies European Tour. It was last played at Golf & Country Club Seddiner See near Berlin, Germany.

The tournament was first played as the Ladies British Masters at Mottram Hall in the North West of England in 2000 and 2001. After a ten-year hiatus, it was re-established in 2012 at Buckinghamshire Golf Club near London, home to the Ladies European Tour’s headquarters. Held 16–18 August, it fell between the 2012 Summer Olympics and 2012 Summer Paralympics in London, 20 minutes away.

The tournament was renamed the Ladies European Masters in 2013 to signify its importance on the LET schedule, with ISPS Handa remaining the title sponsor.

Winners

References

External links
Coverage on the Ladies European Tour's official site

Ladies European Tour events
Golf tournaments in England
Golf tournaments in Germany
Sport in Buckinghamshire
Sport in Düsseldorf
International Sports Promotion Society
Recurring sporting events established in 2000
2000 establishments in Europe